Henry Farmer Dobyns, Jr. (July 3, 1925 – June 21, 2009) was an anthropologist, author and researcher specializing in the ethnohistory and demography of native peoples in the American hemisphere. He is most well known for his groundbreaking demographic research on the size of indigenous American populations before the arrival of Christopher Columbus in 1492.

Early life and education
Dobyns was born in Tucson, Arizona on July 3, 1925 to Henry F. and Susie Kell Dobyns, and spent his childhood in Casa Grande, Arizona. He graduated from Casa Grande Union High School and then immediately entered the U.S. Army in 1943.  Following his service, he attended the University of Arizona where he received a B.A. in Anthropology in 1949 as well as a M.A. in Anthropology in 1956.

Dobyns received his Doctorate degree in Anthropology from Cornell University in 1960.

Career

Dobyns worked with Native American tribes on land claims and a water rights case while he was a graduate student at the University of Arizona in 1952.  He continued this work over the next 50 years with various tribes. From 1952 to 1956, he gathered ethnohistorical and archaeological evidence for the Hualapai Tribal Nation’s land claims case and acted as an expert witness before the U.S. Supreme Court with much of the information in his M.A. thesis being used in the Indian Claims Commission hearings. He also spent three decades working as a consultant for the Gila River Indian Community in their litigation over water rights.

He joined the Cornell Peru Project in 1960 after earning his Ph.D. There he worked as a research coordinator from 1960 to 1962, and as a Peace Corps coordinator from 1962 to 1964, and coordinator of the Comparative Studies of Cultural Change program.  He was also the Coordinator of the Andean Indian Community Research and Development project from 1963 to 1966, and the Associate Director of the Cornell Peru Project.  Dobyns was made Director of the project in 1966 after the death of the former director, Allan R. Holmberg.

Teaching

From 1949 to 1952 he was an instructor at Cornell University’s Field Laboratory in Applied Anthropology in Arizona and New Mexico.

In 1966 Dobyns became the Chairman of the Department of Anthropology at the University of Kentucky. In 1970, he joined the staff of Prescott College, Center of Man and Environment as a professor and later as the Vice-president for Academic Affairs. Between 1977 and 1979 he taught at the University of Florida, Gainesville. Dobyns taught at the University of Wisconsin–Parkside from 1974 to 1977 and also 1983 through 1984. In 1983 he directed seminars on Native American Historical Demography, funded by the National Endowment for the Humanities (NEH).  He was a professor at the University of Oklahoma in 1989.

Dobyns also worked as a senior researcher at the Bureau of Applied Research in Anthropology at the University of Arizona and on projects for the National Park Service.  Between 1980 and the early 1990s, he returned to the Newberry Library each summer to contribute to the NEH Summer Institute in Native American Literature.

Awards and accolades

Dobyns has been awarded numerous fellowships in support of his research, including:
 The National Science Foundation fellowship from 1956 to 1957
 The Social Science Research Council fellowship in 1959
 The National Endowment for the Humanities fellowship for research at the Newberry Library in Chicago

Dobyns won the Bronislaw Malinowski Award from the Society for Applied Anthropology in 1951 for his article "Blunders with Bolsas." He was a lifetime member of the Arizona Historical Society.

Personal life
In 1948 Dobyns married Zipporah Pottenger with whom he had four children; Rique, Bill, Maritha and Mark.  He married his second wife, anthropologist Dr. Cara Richards in 1958 and had one child, York Dobyns. In 1968 he married his third wife, Mary Faith Patterson.

Dobyns died June 21, 2009.

Selected works
Dobyns began his extensive publishing career while he was a graduate student.

Papagos in the Cotton Fields (1951)
Tubac Through Four Centuries: A Historical Resume and Analysis (1959)
Estimating Aboriginal American Population: An Appraisal of Techniques with a New Hemispheric Estimate (1966) 
The Ghost Dance of 1889 among the Pai Indians of Northwestern Arizona (1967)
Spanish Colonial Tucson: A Demographic History (1976)
Indians of the Southwest: A Critical Bibliography (1980)
From Fire to Flood: Historic Human Destruction of Sonoran Desert Riverine (1981)
Their Number Become Thinned (1983) 

From 1971 to 1976 Dobyns edited the Indian Tribal Series, a 40 volume series of tribal history and culture of which Dobyns wrote six volumes.

References

External links
Guide to the Henry F. Dobyns Papers
Tubac Through Four Centuries: A Historical Resume and Analysis

Writers from Tucson, Arizona
1925 births
2009 deaths
University of Kentucky faculty
Cornell University alumni
University of Arizona alumni
Place of death missing
20th-century American anthropologists